Haripur Barabari, is a palace in Horipur Union of Nasirnagar Upazila at Brahmanbaria district, Bangladesh earlier known as East Bengal. This palace founded by Jamindar Krishna Prasad Roy Choudhury(1870-1936) in eighteenth century.

Location
Haripur Barabari stands at the east of  the Titas. This is known as Horipur Jamindarbari or Horipur Rajbari. This is at the west of the village and south-east  afar from Nasirnagar, on the way to Madhabpur Upazila. Especially in the rainy season water fulfills everywhere then beauty of the palace increases.

Constriction
Haripur Barabari is a multi domed three stored building. Area and stylish architecture implies the historical craft, architecture and structural perfection. This palace boundary acquires nearly 5 acres of high land with 60 chambers including Theater, Darbar Hall, Store house, Cowsheds, Kitchen, Casino, Play ground, Pagoda, Temple, small pond etc. Six stare cases are at six side of the palace for first floor and two stare cases for second floor. Six bedrooms at the north-west, four at the east and four at the west side of the pond. There is a big brick build wharf() at the west of the palace that falls on the river and both sides decorated by pagodas of Krishna Prasad Roy Choudhury at the north and Gouri Prasad Roy at the south. People of this area used river route for communication and comfortable journey and most probably wharf kept as the main gate for the same purpose.

Gallery

History
Haripur landlords were influential landlords successor of Tripura district. People of Sunamganj(), Chhatak(), Dowarabazar() and Ajmirigonj() paid tax to the landlords.  They have good relations with landlords of Guniauk another village of Nasirnagar Upazila. After the partition of 1947 the landlords left the palace and went to Kolkata. Historical boat race started from this place. Many parts of the palace are damaged but still existing a  'Pasha Board' on the second floor used to play Pasha with their mates. Dance floor for entertainment by the Dancers (Baijee) performed every night.

Presently, a part of descendant is living only at the ground floor and practices religious culture. Haripur Barabari is now under care of the Department of Archaeology, Bangladesh.

Shooting spot
Natural beauties attracts the producers and spotted many films in Haripur Barabari.

References

18th-century architecture
Bengali zamindars
Zamindari estates
1950 disestablishments
Archaeological sites in Brahmanbaria district